SAAN may refer to:
San people or Bushmen, the indigenous people of Southern Africa
SAAN (department store), a defunct chain of discount department stores in Canada
South Asian Awareness Network, a service organization in the United States

See also 
 Saane, a river in Switzerland
 Saâne, a river in France
 SAN (disambiguation)